Venket Ram is an Indian celebrity and fashion photographer, who has shot principal photography stills for several notable films as well as portfolios.

Works

Annual calendar
Venket Ram, has recently started an annual calendar inspired by other brands such as Dabboo Ratnani and Kingfisher, and began photography for it 2010.

2011 Shots were taken in Chennai and Hyderabad of actors modelling with vintage cars. The calendar was launched by Mani Ratnam on 24 December 2010 with Udhayanidhi Stalin attending the event.

Actors and actresses featured in the calendar: Nagarjuna, Suriya, Vikram, Silambarasan, Karthi, Arya, Trisha Krishnan, Genelia D'Souza, Shriya Saran, Nayantara, Tamannaah Bhatia and Shruti Haasan.

2012

Actresses featured in the calendar: Trisha Krishnan, Richa Gangopadhyay, Priya Anand, Shriya Saran, Amy Jackson, Amala Paul, Samantha, Deeksha Seth, Genelia D'Souza, Sameera Reddy, Mamta Mohandas and Kajal Aggarwal.

Aadhavan, Aasal, Boss Engira Bhaskaran, Enthiran, Kanthaswamy, Madrasapattinam, Naan Mahaan Alla, Paiyaa, Pokkisham, Singam, Vaanam
2020
A series of photoshoots recreating Raja Ravi Varma paintings.
Actresses featured in the calendar: Ramya Krishnan, Lakshmi Manchu, Chamundeswari, Lissy Lakshmi, Khushbu Sundar, Nadhiya, Priyadarshini Govind, Shruti Haasan, Shobana, Aishwarya Rajesh and Samantha Akkineni.

Magazines and brands
He has shot for magazines and brands including:
Arun Ice Creams
Chennai Silks (Anushka Shetty)
Galatta
Inbox 1305 (Shruti Haasan)
Just For Women (Anu Haasan, Raadhika, Shobana, Shriya Saran)
Prince Jewellery
Sathyam Cinemas (Vikram)
Southscope (Genelia D'Souza, Mohanlal, Namitha, Trisha Krishnan, Shriya Saran Venkatesh, Vikram)
Calendar version: Bindu Madhavi, Lakshmi Rai, Reemma Sen
Vivel (Trisha Krishnan)

He has photographed stills and the album cover of Yuvan Shankar Raja's promotional music video "I'll be there for you.

Footnotes

External links
Interview

Indian fashion photographers
Living people
Indian movie stills photographers
Year of birth missing (living people)